Mae Poen is a district (amphoe) in the western part of Nakhon Sawan province, central Thailand.

History
Tambon Mae Poen was separated from Lat Yao district to become a minor district (king amphoe) on 15 July 1996.

On 15 May 2007, all of Thailand's 81 minor districts were upgraded to full districts. With publication in the Royal Gazette on 24 August, the upgrade became official
.

Geography
Neighboring districts are (from the north clockwise): Mae Wong and Chum Ta Bong of Nakhon Sawan Province, Lan Sak and Ban Rai of Uthai Thani province, and Umphang of Tak province.

Administration
The district is divided into a single sub-district (tambon), which is further subdivided into 24 villages (mubans). There are no municipal (thesaban) areas, and a single tambon administrative organization (TAO).

References

External links
amphoe.com

Mae Poen